Obi Obi is a rural locality in the Sunshine Coast Region, Queensland, Australia.

Geography
The suburb covers a large part of the Blackall Range. Large parts of the suburb are within state forest reserves. Obi Obi Creek passes through the suburb from east to west and forms part of the eastern boundary in the south.

History
Obi Obi Provisional School opened on 11 November 1901. On 1 January 1909 it became Obi Obi State School. It closed on 5 July 1959.

See also
 Blackall Range road network

References

Suburbs of the Sunshine Coast Region
Localities in Queensland